Latour is a commune in the Haute-Garonne department in southwestern France.

Geography
The commune is bordered by five other communes, three of them is in Haute-Garonne, and two in Ariège: Bax to the north, Lapeyrère to the east, Montesquieu-Volvestre to the west, and finally by the department of Ariège to the southeast and south by the communes of Loubaut and Méras.

Population

See also
Communes of the Haute-Garonne department

References

Communes of Haute-Garonne